Charlie Vickers (born 24 October 1992) is an Australian actor. He is known for his roles in the historical drama Medici (2018), the film Palm Beach (2019) and the Amazon Prime fantasy series The Lord of the Rings: The Rings of Power (2022).

Early life and education 
Charlie Vickers was born in St Kilda, Melbourne, Australia in 1992, and grew up in Geelong. he studied for an arts degree at RMIT University in Melbourne and took part in amateur theatre, including playing the Judge in Queen's College MADS production of Stephen Sondheim's Sweeney Todd, before undertaking an audition for a UK-based drama school which was held in Sydney. 

To further his acting career, Vickers moved to London, England, where he joined the Royal Central School of Speech and Drama in London, graduating in 2017.

Career
Vickers acting debut came in 2018, with a where he played the  character Guglielmo Pazzi, youngest son of the Pazzi family in eight episodes of the Netflix television series Medici. In 2019, Vickers starred in the Rachel Ward directed comedy-drama film Palm Beach where he played the role of Dan, alongside Sam Neill, Matilda Brown, Greta Scacchi, and Richard E. Grant. In 2020, Vickers appeared in the Douglas Ray thriller film, Death in Shoreditch, in which he portrayed the role of Andrews in the film alongside Carryl Thomas.

In 2022, Vickers landed a main role as Sauron in the Tolkien-based Amazon television series The Lord of the Rings: The Rings of Power, first appearing in episode 2 alongside Morfydd Clark as the Dark Lord's human disguise Halbrand. Vickers was purportedly unaware he was to play Sauron until filming the third episode. To immerse himself in the role, Vickers went hiking for 5 days in the Tongariro National Park, New Zealand. To perform the underwater scenes, Vickers had to learn to freedive. Vickers is a keen runner, having completed several triathlons and regularly done 5 to 10k runs several times a week.

Later in 2022, Vickers starred in a miniseries adaptation of the Holly Ringland novel, The Lost Flowers of Alice Hart.

Filmography

Films

Television

References

External links 
 

Living people
1992 births
21st-century Australian male actors
Alumni of the Royal Central School of Speech and Drama
Australian expatriates in England
Australian male film actors
Australian male television actors
Male actors from Melbourne
People from Geelong